Mileşti may refer to several villages in Romania:

 Mileşti, a village in Șimnicu de Sus Commune, Dolj County
 Mileşti, a village in Făurești Commune, Vâlcea County
 Mileştii de Sus and Mileştii de Jos, villages in Parincea Commune, Bacău County

and a village in Moldova:
 Mileşti, a commune in Nisporeni district